This list contains the names of members of the Japanese Communist Party (JCP) from its founding in 1922 to the present day.

A 
Kanson Arahata
Seiken Akamine

C 
Kim Chon-hae

F 
Tetsuzo Fuwa

H 
Kiyoteru Hanada

I 
Shoichi Ichikawa

K 
Sen Katayama
Hajime Kawakami
Fukumoto Kazuo
Takiji Kobayashi
Akira Koike
Shigeo Kamiyama

M 
Kenji Miyamoto
Yuriko Miyamoto née Chūjō

N 
Eitaro Noro
Sanzo Nosaka

S 
Toshihiko Sakai
Kamejiro Senaga
Yoshio Shiga
Kazuo Shii

T 
Kyuichi Tokuda

W 
Masanosuke Watanabe

Y 
Hitoshi Yamakawa

References

Communism in Japan
Japanese Communist Party